Alfred Southcott Morrish FRCO (13 December 1906 – 1978) was an organist and composer based in England.

Life 
He was born in 1906 in Aldershot, Hampshire. He studied organ at Exeter Cathedral under Dr. Thomas Armstrong and Dr. Alfred William Wilcock. He was awarded his FRCO in 1936.

From 1934 he was organist at the Cadbury Deanery Choral Festivals.

He married Mary Taylor.

He died in 1978.

Appointments 
Organist of St Paul's Church, Devonport 1925–1932
Assistant Organist of Crediton Parish Church 1932–1937
Organist of Sandford Parish Church 1934–1937
Organist of St James' Church, Teignmouth 1937–1945
Organist of Hexham Abbey 1945–1948
Organist of All Souls' Church, Hastings 1950 - ????
Organist of St Ethelburga's Church, St Leonards on Sea 1964 - ????

Compositions 
His compositions include compositions for choir and organ and a string quartet in F.

References 

1906 births
1978 deaths
English organists
British male organists
20th-century classical musicians
20th-century English composers
20th-century organists
20th-century British male musicians